Alexandra Maïté Lacrabère (born 27 April 1987) is a French handball player. She is a former player of the French national team.

Career
Lacrabère has won gold medals at 2017 World Championships, the 2018 European Championships and the Tokyo 2020 Olympic Games in addition to silver medals at the 2011 World Championships, 2016 Olympic Games and the 2020 European Championships. She also has a bronze medal from the 2016 European Championships.

She is openly lesbian.

Individual awards
French Championship Top Scorer: 2012, 2014
French Championship Best Right Back: 2012, 2014
French Championship MVP: 2012

References

External links

Living people
1987 births
Sportspeople from Pau, Pyrénées-Atlantiques
French female handball players
Olympic handball players of France
Olympic medalists in handball
Olympic gold medalists for France
Olympic silver medalists for France
Handball players at the 2008 Summer Olympics
Handball players at the 2012 Summer Olympics
Handball players at the 2016 Summer Olympics
Handball players at the 2020 Summer Olympics
Medalists at the 2016 Summer Olympics
Medalists at the 2020 Summer Olympics
Lesbian sportswomen
LGBT handball players
French LGBT sportspeople
Expatriate handball players
French expatriate sportspeople in North Macedonia
French expatriate sportspeople in Russia
French expatriate sportspeople in Spain
European champions for France
21st-century LGBT people